Morabeza is a word from Cape Verdean creole that is used to express Cape Verdean hospitality, as realized by the friendliness, casual and relaxed behavior of the Cape Verdean population and its culture. As a proper noun, it may refer to:

 Morabeza, a music album by Bana
 "Morabeza", a song by Cesária Évora from the album Miss Perfumado
 "Morabeza", a short story by Manuel Ferreira
 Hotel Morabeza, Cape Verde's first resort hotel, located in Santa Maria, Cape Verde
 Alto Morabeza, a neighborhood in Mindelo, Cape Verde
 Rádio Morabeza, a radio station based in Mindelo, Cape Verde
 SC Morabeza, a football club based on the island of Brava, Cape Verde
 GD Kê Morabeza, a football club based on the island of São Tomé, São Tomé and Príncipe